"Black Balloon" is a song by American rock band Goo Goo Dolls. It was released in June 1999 as the fourth single from the band's sixth studio album, Dizzy Up the Girl (1998), and reached number three in Canada, number 16 in the United States and number 23 in Iceland.

Meaning and composition
The song, according to lead singer John Rzeznik, is based on a woman who is struggling with a heroin addiction and her lover who is desperately trying to save her. He has also said that it is about "seeing someone you love that is so great just screw up so bad." Speculation as to the exact subject matter of the song has also been attributed to the ex-wife of bassist Robby Takac (who had overdosed on heroin).

Like many other songs by Goo Goo Dolls, "Black Balloon" uses an unusual alternate tuning. Several electric guitars used in the introduction and the acoustic rhythm guitar are tuned to an open D-flat fifth chord. It was half-stepped on the album version.

Chart performance
The track reached number 13 and number 28 on the US Billboard Modern Rock Tracks and Mainstream Rock Tracks charts, respectively. "Black Balloon" was the band's first commercially released single in the US since "Name" in 1995, reaching number 16 on the Billboard Hot 100 with its combined sales and airplay figures. In Canada, the song reached number three on the RPM Top Singles chart, giving the Goo Goo Dolls their fourth top-three hit there. Outside North America, the song charted in Iceland and the United Kingdom, reaching number 23 in the former country and number 76 in the latter.

Music video
The video for the song opens with a woman blowing smoke into a soap bubble. The video then shows scenes from a 1950s era swim club while the band performs the song. The video was directed by Nancy Bardawil.

Live performances
During live performances of the song, fans can often be seen inflating black balloons and batting them around in the crowd.

Track listings

US CD, 7-inch, and cassette single
 "Black Balloon" (radio remix) – 4:09
 "Slide" (live version) – 3:33

Australian CD single
 "Black Balloon"
 "Lazy Eye"
 "Naked" (remix)
 "Flat Top"

UK CD single
 "Black Balloon" (radio edit) – 3:59
 "Black Balloon" (album version) – 4:10
 "Naked" – 3:44

European CD single
 "Black Balloon" (radio edit) – 3:59
 "Naked" – 3:44

Charts

Weekly charts

Year-end charts

Certifications

Release history

References

1998 songs
1999 singles
Black-and-white music videos
Edel AG singles
Goo Goo Dolls songs
Hollywood Records singles
Song recordings produced by Rob Cavallo
Songs about heroin
Songs written by John Rzeznik
Warner Records singles